Paul Manning (born April 15, 1979) is a Canadian retired professional ice hockey defenceman. He played eight National Hockey League (NHL) games with the Columbus Blue Jackets during the 2002–03 season. The rest of his career, which lasted from 2001 to 2012, was mainly spent with the Hannover Scorpions of the Deutsche Eishockey Liga. He was selected by the Calgary Flames in the 3rd round (62nd overall) of the 1998 NHL Entry Draft.

Manning was also drafted by New York Yankees with the 619th pick in the 1997 Major League Baseball Draft

Career statistics

Regular season and playoffs

Awards and honors

References

External links
 

1979 births
Living people
Calgary Flames draft picks
Canadian expatriate ice hockey players in Germany
Canadian expatriate ice hockey players in the United States
Canadian ice hockey defencemen
Colorado College Tigers men's ice hockey players
Columbus Blue Jackets players
Elmira Jackals (UHL) players
Hamburg Freezers players
Hannover Scorpions players
Ice hockey people from Alberta
Sportspeople from Red Deer, Alberta
Syracuse Crunch players